The 1984–85 Scottish Premier Division season was won by Aberdeen, seven points ahead of Celtic. Dumbarton and Morton were relegated. As of 2022-23, this is the last season that a team other than Rangers or Celtic has won the top level of Scottish football; it also marked a third consecutive year that a team other than Celtic or Rangers won the Scottish title, the only time this has ever happened.

Table

Results

Matches 1–18
During matches 1–18 each team plays every other team twice (home and away).

Matches 19–36
During matches 19–36 each team plays every other team twice (home and away).

References
Statto

Scottish Premier Division seasons
1
Scot